Bertiera pauloi is a species of flowering plant in the family Rubiaceae. It is endemic to Tanzania.

References

Sources

External links
World Checklist of Rubiaceae

Flora of Tanzania
pauloi
Vulnerable plants
Taxonomy articles created by Polbot